William L. Archie (December 25, 1930 – March 19, 2022) was an American football coach and college athletics administrator. He served as the head football coach at Norfolk State University from 1961 to 1966, compiling a record of 21–25. Archie was also the athletic director at Norfolk State from 1970 to 1984.

A native of Welch, West Virginia, Archie attended West Virginia State University, where he played football and basketball.

Archie died on March 19, 2022, at the age of 91.

Head coaching record

References

1930 births
2022 deaths
20th-century African-American sportspeople
21st-century African-American sportspeople
American football quarterbacks
Norfolk State Spartans athletic directors
Norfolk State Spartans football coaches
West Virginia State Yellow Jackets football players
West Virginia State Yellow Jackets men's basketball players
People from Welch, West Virginia
Coaches of American football from West Virginia
Players of American football from West Virginia
Basketball players from West Virginia
African-American coaches of American football
African-American players of American football
African-American basketball players
African-American college athletic directors in the United States